John Martin Kenny was a superintendent during the Queensland Aborigine Protection era.  He arrived at Hull River on 1 September 1914 and established the Hull River Aboriginal Settlement.

His mother was Catherine Kenny (nee Brown).

He, and his daughter Kathleen, died on 10 March 1918 as a result of flying debris from a massive cyclone that devastated the Mission.  As a result, all survivors were relocated to Palm Island.

References

There are dozens of good quality references here.

1918 deaths
19th-century births